The Cinema of India pavilion has garnered recognition at the Cannes Film Festival since its inception in 1946. The 1946 social-realistic film Neecha Nagar became the first Indian film to gain recognition at the Cannes, after it was awarded Palme d'Or at the first Cannes. In 1955, Special Mention (child actress) was received by Naaz for her work in Boot Polish by Prakash Aurora.

In 1956, Satyajit Ray's Pather Panchali won the Best Human Document Award. In the same year Gotoma the Buddha by Rajbans Khanna, won Special mention for Best direction. In 1983 Mrinal Sen's directorial Kharij, won the Jury Prize. In 1988, Mira Nair's Oscar Nominated film Salaam Bombay! won the Caméra d'Or ("Golden Camera"). In 1989, Shaji N. Karun's, Piravi has garnered the Caméra d'Or - Mention Spéciale. The 1999 film Marana Simhasanam directed by Murali Nair also received the Caméra d'Or.

Tous Les Cinemas du Monde (2007)
Tous Les Cinemas du Monde (World Cinema) began in 2005 to showcase films from a variety of different countries. At the 60th Cannes, the first two days of this program held during 19 May to 25 May 2007 featured special screening of Indian films; Saira (2005), Missed Call (2005), Lage Raho Munna Bhai (2006), Dosar (2006), Veyil, (2006), Guru (2007), Goal (2007), and Dharm (2007).

Official Guest Country (2013)

On the occasion of 100 Years of Indian Cinema, India was the Official Guest Country at the 66th Cannes. The event featured special screening of Indian films; Bombay Talkies (Gala screenings), Monsoon Shootout (Midnight screenings), Charulata (Cannes classics),  Bollywood: The Greatest Love Story Ever Told (Beach screenings),  The Lunchbox (Critic's week), Ugly (Director's fortnight), Eega (Film market), and Tau Seru (Shorts). The first Incredible India Exhibition, a joint participation of the Ministry of Tourism and Ministry of Information and Broadcasting, Republic of India was inaugurated by Indian actor Chiranjeevi.

Country of Honour - Marché du Film (2022) 
On the occasion of 75 years of diplomatic ties between India and France, India was announced as the Official Country of Honour at the 2022 Cannes Film Market. The first of its kind event featured special beach screenings of Six Indian feature films; Pratidwandi (1970), Godavari (2021), Alpha Beta Gamma (2021), Rocketry: The Nambi Effect (2022), Dhuin (2022), Boomba Ride (2022), and Nirae Thathakalulla Maramy (2022). 

Under the Goes to Cannes Section; five parallel films were featured in the Work in Progress Lab - Baghjan by Jaicheng Jai Dohutia - Assamese, Moran; Bailadila by Shailendra Sahu - Hindi, Chhattisgarhi; Ek Jagah Apni (A Space of Our Own) by Ektara Collective - Hindi; Follower by Harshad Nalawade - Marathi, Kannada, Hindi; Shivamma by Jai Shankar - Kannada. In addition, India - Content Hub of the World Pavilion was inaugurated at the venue on 18 May 2022.

Cannes XR
Cannes XR is a program from the Marché du Film dedicated to immersive technologies and cinematographic content
2017 - Indian epic film duology Baahubali was featured at the VR exhibition.
2022 - Indian virtual reality film Le Musk was featured at the VR exhibition.

Competitive Awards and Nominations

Technical Awards and Nominations

Indian Jury Members at Cannes

Gallery

See also 
 List of Indian winners and nominees of the Academy Awards
 List of Indian winners and nominees of the Golden Globe Awards
 List of Indian submissions for the Academy Award for Best International Feature Film
 List of Indian Grammy Award winners and nominees

References

Cinema of India
Cannes
Cannes Film Festival